Godoya obovata is a species of tree in the family Ochnaceae. It is native to South America.

References

Trees of Peru
Ochnaceae